On the Fly is an American reality documentary television series on TLC. The series profiles the operations of Southwest Airlines and how passengers behave and act in the airport which is very similar to A&E's series Airline, and premiered on May 24, 2012. The show takes place at several different airports in the continental United States. Some of the airports include Baltimore-Washington International Airport in Baltimore, Maryland, Chicago Midway in Chicago Illinois, Hobby Airport in Houston Texas, Louis Armstrong International Airport in New Orleans, Louisiana and Tampa International Airport in Tampa, Florida.

Episodes

References

2010s American reality television series
2012 American television series debuts
Documentary television series about aviation
English-language television shows
Southwest Airlines
TLC (TV network) original programming